Major General (Aluf) Yacov Bengo (Born July 1971) is an Israeli general currently serving as the head of the Multi-Branch Force Build-up Directorate of the Israel Defense Forces. His military career spans approximately thirty years of service, mainly in the Armored Corps.

Biography 
With his recruitment to the IDF, Bengo Conscripted in the Armored Corps in the 211st Brigade. He went through Advanced combat training and Tank commander training. He later completed the officer's course and became the commander for an armor platoon, after which he continued to serve in several command roles, amongst which were: Company commander in the 82nd Armor Battalion between 1993 and 1995, Commander of Palsar 7 between 1995 and 1997, Vice commander of the 75th Armor Battalion 1997–1998, and as commander of the 75th Armor Battalion between 2001 and 2003.

He later served as Instructor at the IDF Officers training School (B.H.D 1) until 2004, then as Instructor at the Tactical Command College (IDNC) until 2005.

He served as the head of the land branch in the IDF Planning Directorate until 2007.

In 2007 he was appointed as the commander of the 14th Armored Brigade, and as the head for the center of live fire training, serving both roles simultaneously until 2009, when he became the commander of the 7th Armored Brigade. leaving that role In 2011 to become Head of the IDF Operations Department (J33)

In 2013 he was promoted to Tat Aluf (Brigadier general) and appointed as the commander of the 146th armored Division, then on 2015 he was appointed as the commander for 36th armored Division until the 18th of march 2018. later in the same year he became the Head of the IDF Doctrine and Training Division (J7).

In September 2019 he was promoted to the rank of Aluf and appointed as the head of the northern command, while still simultaneously serving as the head of the Doctrine and Instructions division. Then in August 2020 he was also appointed as the commander for the multidimensional maneuvering command in the Ground Forces.

In 2019 Bengo co-Published a book called "Operational Focus: an Approach to Describe, Plan, and Manage in Contemporary Military Operations" with Matania Tzachi, which presents a force application and build-up model in the strategic level. The book followed a series of articles he penned a couple years earlier.

In January 2022 Bengo was appointed as the head of the Multi-Branch Force Build-Up directorate.

Education and personal life 
Bengo has a Bachelor's degree and Master's degree in Political science from The Hebrew University, with his M.A's Thesis being on the subject of "Nationalism and the nomadic paradigm A new way of analyzing an old phenomenon".

In June 2021 Bengo received his Ph.D in General History from Bar-Ilan University for his Thesis, which he did in the department of General History, with Dr Tal Tovy as his Doctoral advisor, on the subject of: "The hidden methodology of the general theory of war".

Bengo is married and a father to two children.

References

External links 
 Bengo, Yacov, and Tal Tovy, "Dead Fish Go with the Flow": The Military Theorists Who Should Be Role Models for IDF Officers", Marachot 488 (2020), 10-15 (Hebrew only).
 Bengo, Yacov, and Shay Shabtai, "The Post Operational Level Age: How to Properly Maintain the Interface between Policy, Strategy, and Tactics in Current Military Challenges", Infinity Journal 4:3 (2015), 4–10.
 Bengo, Yacov, and Giora Segal, "The Post-Operational Level Age: The Operational Focus Approach, Part 2", Infinity Journal 4:4 (2015), 3–10.
 Bengo, Yacov, and Shay Shabtai, "The Post-Operational Level Age: From Concept to Implementation, Part 3", Infinity Journal 5:1 (2015), 4–8.

Hebrew University of Jerusalem alumni
Israeli generals
1971 births
Living people